Bristol station may refer to:

United Kingdom
 Bristol Temple Meads railway station, the main railway station in central Bristol
 Bristol Parkway railway station, in the northern suburbs of Bristol
 Bristol St Philip's railway station, former small terminus station in Bristol
 Bristol bus station, Bristol's main bus and coach station

United States
 Bristol station (SEPTA), in Bristol, Pennsylvania
 Bristol station (Virginia), a historic railroad station in Bristol, Virginia

See also
Bristol (disambiguation)